September is a 2011 Turkish drama film written and directed by Cemil Ağacıkoğlu and starring Turgay Aydın and Görkem Yeltan as an introverted couple who encounter a maltreated young woman.

References

2011 drama films
Films set in Turkey
Films set in Istanbul
2011 films
Turkish drama films
2010s Turkish-language films